Vibrations is a Roy Ayers album released under the Roy Ayers Ubiquity umbrella. It was released in 1976 on Polydor Records.

Track listing
All tracks composed by Roy Ayers; except where indicated
"Domelo (Give It To Me)" - (Edwin Birdsong, Roy Ayers)  4:00 	
"Baby I Need Your Love" - 2:30 	
"Higher" - 4:02 	
"The Memory" - (Edwin Birdsong, Roy Ayers,  William Allen)  4:31 	
"Come Out and Play" - (Edwin Birdsong, Roy Ayers,  William Allen)  3:45 	
"Better Days" - 3:17 	
"Searching" - 4:10 	
"One Sweet Love to Remember" - (Edwin Birdsong, Roy Ayers,  William Allen)  4:20 	
"Vibrations" - 3:00 	
"Moving Grooving" - 5:01 	
"Baby You Give Me a Feeling" -  (Edwin Birdsong, Roy Ayers)  3:02

Personnel
Roy Ayers - Lead Vocals, Backing Vocals, Vibraphone (Deagan Vibraharp), Piano, Electric Piano, Synthesizer, Percussion
Edwin Birdsong - Vocals
Philip Woo - Piano, Electric Piano, Synthesizer, Harmonica
Chano O'Ferral - Congas, Percussion
Chuck Anthony - Guitar
William Allen - Electric Bass
Steve Cobb - Drums
Justo Almario - Tenor Saxophone
John Mosley - Trumpet
Chicas -  Lead Vocals, Backing Vocals

Charts

References

External links
 Roy Ayers Ubiquity- Vibrations at Discogs

Roy Ayers albums
1976 albums
Polydor Records albums